Raymond Meunier (15 January 1920 – 17 June 2010) was a French actor. He appeared in more than thirty films from 1947 to 2005.

Selected filmography

References

External links 
 

1920 births
2010 deaths
People from Fontainebleau
French male film actors
French male television actors